Mid-Ohio Valley Regional Airport  is seven miles northeast of Parkersburg, in Wood County, West Virginia. It is owned by the Wood County Airport Authority and is also known as Wood County Airport or Gill Robb Wilson Field. It serves the Mid-Ohio Valley area which includes the Ohio cities of Marietta and Belpre and the West Virginia cities of Williamstown, Parkersburg and Vienna. It has scheduled passenger service subsidized by the Essential Air Service program.

The Federal Aviation Administration says the airport had 5,275 passenger boardings (enplanements) in calendar year 2008, 5,930 in 2009 and 5,477 in 2010. The National Plan of Integrated Airport Systems for 2011–2015 categorized it as a non-primary commercial service airport.

The first airline flights were American DC-3s in 1946. All American arrived in 1949 and Piedmont in 1955; Lake Central replaced American in 1961. The first jets were Allegheny at the end of 1976; Piedmont pulled out in 1979 and Allegheny Commuter replaced Allegheny in 1980.

Facilities
The airport covers 1,103 acres (446 ha) at an elevation of 859 feet (262 m). It has two asphalt runways: 3/21 is 7,240 by 150 feet (2,207 x 46 m) and 10/28 is 4,002 by 150 feet (1,220 x 46 m).

In the year ending September 30, 2011 the airport had 34,485 aircraft operations, average 94 per day: 62% general aviation, 23% military, 14% air taxi, and <1% airline. 56 aircraft were then based at the airport: 68% single-engine, 20% military, 5% multi-engine, 5% jet, and 2% helicopter.

Airline and destination

Statistics

Destination statistics

References

Other sources

 Essential Air Service documents (Docket DOT-OST-2005-20734) from the U.S. Department of Transportation:
 Notice (March 22, 2005): of Air Midwest, Inc. of its intent to discontinue scheduled non-subsidized Essential Air Service between Parkersburg, West Virginia and Pittsburgh, Pennsylvania, effective June 20, 2005.
 Order 2005-4-19 (April 19, 2005): prohibiting Air Midwest, Inc., from terminating its unsubsidized, scheduled air service at Parkersburg, Morgantown and Clarksburg/Fairmont, West Virginia, beyond the end of its 90-day notice periods, and requesting proposals from carriers interested in providing replacement essential air service (EAS) at the communities, with or without subsidy.
 Order 2005-9-8 (September 9, 2005): selecting RegionsAir, Inc. to provide subsidized essential air Service (EAS) at Parkersburg, Morgantown and Clarksburg/Fairmont, West Virginia for a two-year period and establishing a combined subsidy rate of $1,051,333 per year for service consisting of 18 nonstop round trips each week between Parkersburg and Cincinnati, and 18 round trips to Cincinnati each week over a MGW-CKB-CVG-CKB-MGW routing, with 34-seat Saab 340A aircraft.
 Order 2007-1-16 (January 25, 2007): selecting Colgan Air, Inc. d/b/a US Airways Express to provide subsidized essential air service (EAS) at Parkersburg, Morgantown, and Clarksburg/Fairmont, West Virginia, for two years, beginning when the carrier inaugurates service. Each community will receive 19 weekly round trips to Pittsburgh with 34-passenger Saab 340 aircraft. Service from Parkersburg will be nonstop in each direction. Service from Morgantown and Clarksburg/Fairmont will be served with a Pittsburgh - Morgantown - Clarksburg - Pittsburgh or a Pittsburgh - Clarksburg - Morgantown - Pittsburgh routing. The total combined annual subsidy is $2,421,914.
 Ninety-Day Notice (March 28, 2008): of intent of Colgan Air Inc. D/B/A United Express to terminate scheduled essential air service at Parkersburg, Morgantown and Clarksburg/Fairmont, WV, effective June 28, 2008.
 Order 2008-5-37 (May 27, 2008): re-selecting Colgan Air, Inc. d/b/a United Express, to provide subsidized essential air service (EAS) at Morgantown and Clarksburg/Fairmont, West Virginia, at a total annual subsidy rate of $2,116,650, for the two-year period of June 1, 2008, through May 31, 2010, requesting proposals, with or without subsidy, by June 18 from carriers interested in providing EAS at Parkersburg, West Virginia, for a new two-year period, beginning when the carrier inaugurates full service, and setting a final rate for an interim period for Colgan's service at Parkersburg, West Virginia, in order for the carrier to be compensated, from June 1, 2008, until further Department action, pending the completion of the carrier-selection case.
 Order 2008-7-22 (July 17, 2008): re-selecting Colgan Air, Inc. d/b/a United Express to provide subsidized essential air service at Parkersburg, West Virginia, at an annual subsidy rate of $2,190,281, for the period of August 1, 2008, through July 31, 2010.
 Order 2010-6-25 (June 29, 2010): re-selecting Colgan Air, Inc. to provide essential air service (EAS) at Clarksburg/Fairmont and Morgantown, WV, for a combined annual subsidy of $2,976,438, and at Beckley, WV, for an annual subsidy of $2,313, 457, for the two-year period from August 1, 2010, through July 31, 2012. Also selecting Gulfstream International Airlines, Inc., to provide EAS at Parkersburg, WV/Marietta, OH, at an annual subsidy rate of $2,642,237, for a two-year period beginning when the carrier inaugurates full EAS through the end of the 24th month thereafter. The total annual subsidy for all four communities is $7,923,132.
 Order 2012-9-23 (September 27, 2012): selecting Silver Airways to provide Essential Air Service (EAS) at Bradford, DuBois, Franklin/Oil City, Pennsylvania, Jamestown, New York, and Parkersburg, West Virginia/Marietta, Ohio, for a combined annual subsidy of $10,348,117 ($1,940,272 for Bradford; $2,587,029 for DuBois, $1,293,515 for Franklin, $1,940,272 for Jamestown, and $2,587,029 for Parkersburg), from October 1, 2012, through September 30, 2014.
 Notice of Intent (February 14, 2014): of Silver Airways Corp. to discontinue scheduled air service between Cleveland, Ohio (CLE) and: Jamestown, New York (JHW), Bradford, Pennsylvania (BFD), DuBois, Pennsylvania (DUJ), Franklin/Oil City, Pennsylvania (FKL), and Parkersburg, West Virginia/Marietta, Ohio (PKB).

External links
 
 
 Parkersburg/Mid-Ohio Valley Regional Airport at West Virginia DOT Airport Directory
 Aerial image as of April 1996 from USGS The National Map
 
 

Airports in West Virginia
Essential Air Service
Buildings and structures in Wood County, West Virginia
Transportation in Wood County, West Virginia